Kermit Romeo Erasmus (born 8 July 1990) is a South African professional soccer player who plays for South African Premier Soccer League side Orlando Pirates and the South Africa national team.

Born in Port Elizabeth, Erasmus moved to Pretoria as a teenager where he made his professional debut with SuperSport United in 2007. He spent the next two seasons in the Netherlands with Feyenoord and Excelsior before returning to SuperSport United. During his second spell with the club, he made over 50 appearances and helped his side to the Nedbank Cup title before joining Orlando Pirates in 2013. He led Pirates to the same cup title in 2014 before leaving to join Rennes in France the following year.

Erasmus struggled with Rennes, however, and shortly after spending a stint on loan at Ligue 2 side, Lens, was released by the club. He spent the remainder of the 2018 in Sweden, with Eskilstuna, and Portugal, with Vitória de Setúbal.

Club career

Early career
Erasmus was groomed by, and graduated from the SuperSport Feyenoord Academy (now SuperSport United Youth Academy) to join Feyenoord but remained at SuperSport United on trial for 2007–08 season. During the campaign, Erasmus made 10 appearances and scored once as Supersport clinched their first ever PSL title.

Feyenoord
On 29 May 2008, Eredivisie side Feyenoord announced the signing of Erasmus on a three-year deal from South African affiliate-club SuperSport United and handed him the no. 15 jersey for the 2008–09 season. He made only four appearances for the Rotterdam club during the campaign and in July 2009 it was announced Erasmus would be loaned to satellite club Excelsior in the Eerste Divisie for the following season. Erasmus, together with compatriot Kamohelo Mokotjo and six other Feyenoord players were loaned to Excelsior as a result of a new partnership between the two Rotterdam-based clubs.

Loan to Excelsior
Erasmus made his debut for Excelsior on 8 August and netted a late, headed equalizer in a 2–2 draw Telstar. By the conclusion of the season, Erasmus had netted 12 goals in 30 appearances whilst on loan at Excelsior. He did not return to Feyenoord, however, and the no.15 jersey he had previously worn was handed to Mokotjo for the upcoming season. During his time in the Netherlands Erasmus was nominated for the 2009 CAF Most Promising Talent of the Year award but lost out in the end to Ghana's Dominic Adiyiah.

Supersport United
On 10 July 2010, it was announced that Erasmus would be returning to South Africa to rejoin SuperSport United after failing to make the grade at Feyenoord. Eleven days after his return, Erasmus made his second appearance for Supersport United and scored what was described as a "sensational strike" in an MTN 8 loss against Moroka Swallows.

On 26 May 2012, Erasmus scored the second goal in Matsatsantsa's 2–0 win over Mamelodi Sundowns in the Nedbank Cup final. He left Supersport United at the end of the following season having made over 50 league appearances during his second spell at the club.

Orlando Pirates
On 23 July 2013, Irvin Khoza, the Chairman of Orlando Pirates, confirmed the signing of Erasmus from Supersport United. The following day Pirates lodged a request to CAF for Erasmus to be registered for the upcoming CAF Champions League campaign. The request was denied, however, as Erasmus had already represented Supersport United in the CAF Confederations Cup earlier in the season. As per CAF regulations, a player is only eligible to feature for one club in CAF inter-club competitions during the course of a season.

The 2014–15 season proved to be the most fruitful of Erasmus' spell in Soweto as he netted a career-best 10 goals over the course of the PSL campaign. He also scored his first professional hat-trick on 2 May in a 3–0 CAF Confederations Cup win over Gabonese side CF Mounana. Erasmus then crowned the season off in style on 17 May by netting a match-winning brace as Orlando Pirates triumphed 3–1 over Bidvest Wits to lift the 2014 Nedbank Cup.

On 8 January 2016, Erasmus was named in the 18-man CAF Team of the Year. He had also been nominated for the 2015 CAF African-based African Player of the Year award alongside Orlando Pirates teammate Filipe Ovono but eventually lost out to Mbwana Ally Samatta of Tanzania. Eight days later, he netted a late equalizer in 3–3 PSL draw with Maritzburg United, with Pirates having trailed 3–0 in the first half. The goal proved to be Erasmus' final contribution for the Sea Robbers as the following week he completed a move to French Ligue 1 side Rennes.

Rennes

On 28 January 2016, Erasmus signed for Ligue 1 club Stade Rennais on a two-and-a-half-year deal. He made his debut for the club on 13 March, coming on as an 80th-minute substitute for Pedro Henrique in a 2–2 draw with Lyon. His only other appearance for the season came on the final day of the campaign in a 2–1 loss to Bastia which saw Rennes end eighth in Ligue 1. He made his first appearance of the following campaign in Rennes' opening match of the season, coming on as a second-half substitute for Gélson Fernandes in a 1–0 defeat to Nice.

Loan to Lens
On 21 January 2017, Erasmus signed for Ligue 2 side RC Lens for the remainder of the season. He scored once in 12 league appearances for the club, with the goal coming on the final day of the season as Lens narrowly missed out on promotion. He returned to Rennes at the end of the campaign but, by February 2018 failed to make another appearance and was released by the club.

AFC Eskilstuna
On 26 March 2018, Erasmus signed a two year-deal with AFC Eskilstuna, newly relegated to Superettan, Sweden's second tier. He went on to play 11 league games for the club, scoring twice, during the season.

Vitória
On 17 August 2018, he transferred to Portuguese club Vitória de Setúbal in the Primeira Liga.

Cape Town City Football Club
On 18 December 2018, Erasmus signed for PSL side Cape Town City.

Orlando Pirates return
On 23 September 2022, Orlando Pirates confirmed the return of Erasmus on a two-year deal, from Mamelodi Sundowns.

International career

Youth
Erasmus represented South Africa at the 2009 FIFA U-20 World Cup in Egypt and scored three goals throughout the course of the tournament.

Senior
Erasmus was called up to the senior squad for the first time in March 2008 for South Africa's friendly against Zimbabwe. In doing so, he was in line to break the record then-held by former captain Aaron Mokoena and become South Africa's youngest ever full international. He did not take to the field and had to wait until 4 September 2010 before he made his debut, coming on as a second-half substitute for Katlego Mphela against Niger in a 2012 African Cup of Nations qualifier. Erasmus had to wait a further three years before scoring his first goal for South Africa, finally netting in a 2014 FIFA World Cup qualification match against Botswana on 7 September 2013.

Personal life
In 2010 Erasmus starred in the award-winning feature Documentary film Soka Afrika which highlighted the plight of young footballers across Africa.

Career statistics

Club

1 Includes Telkom Knockout and KNVB Beker matches. 
2 Includes MTN 8 matches. 
3 Includes UEFA Europa League and CAF Champions League matches.
4 Includes Jupiler Playoff matches.

International

Scores and results list South Africa's goal tally first, score column indicates score after each Erasmus goal.

Honours

Club
Supersport United
Premier Soccer League: 2007–08
Nedbank Cup: 2011–12

Club
Mamelodi Sundowns
Premier Soccer League: 2021-22
MTN 8 Cup : 2021

Orlando Pirates
Nedbank Cup: 2013–14
MTN 8 Cup : 2022

Individual
CAF Team of the Year: 2015 (as a substitute)

References

External links
 Voetbal International: Kermit Erasmus 
 

1990 births
Association football forwards
AFC Eskilstuna players
Eerste Divisie players
Eredivisie players
Expatriate footballers in France
Expatriate footballers in the Netherlands
Expatriate footballers in Sweden
Expatriate footballers in Portugal
Feyenoord players
Ligue 1 players
Ligue 2 players
Living people
Mamelodi Sundowns F.C. players
Orlando Pirates F.C. players
Primeira Liga players
RC Lens players
Excelsior Rotterdam players
South Africa international soccer players
South African expatriate sportspeople in the Netherlands
South African expatriate sportspeople in France
South African expatriate sportspeople in Sweden
South African expatriate sportspeople in Portugal
South African expatriate soccer players
South African soccer players
Sportspeople from Port Elizabeth
Stade Rennais F.C. players
Superettan players
SuperSport United F.C. players
Vitória F.C. players
Cape Town City F.C. (2016) players
Cape Coloureds
Soccer players from the Eastern Cape